The 2006 Monza GP2 Series round was a GP2 Series motor race held on September 9 and 10, 2006 at the Autodromo Nazionale Monza in Monza, Italy. It was the final round of the 2006 GP2 Series season. The race weekend supported the 2006 Italian Grand Prix.

Classification

Qualifying

Feature race

Sprint race

Notes

References

Monza
GP2